Mughal Minar is an archaeological site in Gilgit, Gilgit-Baltistan, Pakistan. It previously served as a Stupa.

References

Archaeological sites in Gilgit-Baltistan
History of Gilgit-Baltistan
Monuments and memorials in Gilgit-Baltistan
Buildings and structures in Gilgit-Baltistan